John Alexander Hull Keith (November 28, 1869 – February 22, 1931) was an American educator as well as an American football and basketball coach.  He served as the head football coach at Northern Illinois State Normal School—now known as Northern Illinois University–from 1899 to 1903 and at Illinois State Normal University—now known as Illinois State University—in 1907, compiling a career college football record of 25–7–7. Keith was also the head basketball coach at Northern Illinois from 1900 to 1902 and again in 1904–05, tallying a mark of 13–7 in three seasons. He also taught at the school as a professor of pedagogy and as an assistant professor of psychology.

Keith died as his home in Harrisburg, Pennsylvania on February 22, 1931.

Head coaching record

Football

References

External links
 

1869 births
1931 deaths
19th-century players of American football
American football quarterbacks
Basketball coaches from Illinois
Illinois State Redbirds football coaches
Northern Illinois Huskies football coaches
Northern Illinois Huskies football players
Northern Illinois Huskies men's basketball coaches
Northern Illinois University faculty
Harvard College alumni
Illinois State University alumni
People from Homer, Illinois